The 1957 San Francisco 49ers season was the team's eighth season in the NFL. Coming off a 5–6–1 record in 1956, the 49ers tied for the best record in the Western Conference at 8–4.

San Francisco continued their late-season success from the previous year, and won five of their first six games, and were in first place in the West midway through the season. The Niners then lost three straight on the road to drop to 5–4, but then won the final three games to close out the season at 8–4, their best season since 1953.

The 49ers tied with the Detroit Lions at the top of the Western Conference, and split their two regular-season games in November, with the home teams winning. This forced a tie-breaking playoff game at Kezar Stadium on December 22. The winner would host the Eastern Conference champion Cleveland Browns for the NFL championship the following week.

The 49ers built a 24–7 lead at halftime, and extended it to twenty points in the third quarter. Detroit's  hall of fame quarterback Bobby Layne had been lost for the season two weeks earlier, and backup Tobin Rote lead the Lions' rally, scoring 24 unanswered points in the second half to win, 31–27, which ended the 49ers' season.

Eight weeks earlier on October 27, 49ers' owner Tony Morabito, age 47, suffered a heart attack in the press box at Kezar during the second quarter of the game against the Chicago Bears. He died shortly after arriving at Mary's Help Hospital on Guerrero Street. The team was notified of his death at halftime, and with tears in their eyes, they went back out and won a come-from-behind victory.

Quarterback Y. A. Tittle had another strong season for the 49ers, completing 63.1% of his passes for 2157 yards and 13 TD's. He also rushed for 6 TD's. End Billy Wilson led the club with 52 receptions for 757 yards, along with a team high 6 TD's. Running back Hugh McElhenny led in rushing with 478 yards on 102 attempts.

Offseason

NFL Draft

Regular season

Schedule

Standings

Western Conference Playoff

References

SHRP Sports
Database Football

San Francisco 49ers seasons
San Francisco 49ers